Kylie Speer is an Australian television host and music, film and entertainment reporter based in Los Angeles. Speer is currently the U.S. Entertainment Correspondent for the Nine Network's live morning television program Today Extra (2013–present) broadcast nationally in Australia. Speer is also the Los Angeles-based film correspondent for BigPond Movies] in Australia (2013–present).

Speer has hosted both the BigPond Movies and BigPond Music channels in Australia (2010 - 2013), as well as "TheFIX" on Ninemsn (2009 - 2012) where she worked as host and reporter on MusicFIX TV, CelebrityFIX TV and the SummerFIX TV series. In 2011, Speer held the role of "Lady Luck" on the Logie Award-winning sports variety television program The Footy Show (NRL), on the Nine Network. In 2011, Speer also worked as a published music journalist for The Sunday Telegraph, Australia's biggest selling newspaper.

Speer is the current host of Audi Hamilton Island Race Week TV (2010–present), an annual lifestyle, travel and entertainment series filmed and broadcast on each day of the two-week event on Hamilton Island in far-north Queensland, Australia. In 2011, Speer presented from the red carpet and backstage winner's room at the annual Australian television industry awards, the TV Week Logie Awards, and in 2012, hosted Foxtel's 2012 ASTRA Awards national red carpet broadcast.

In December 2012, Speer MC'd the Australian Defence Force (ADF) Forces Entertainment Tour to the Sinai Desert in Egypt alongside a number of Australian television and music personalities. Speer is also an ongoing Ambassador for World Animal Protection, an international non-profit animal welfare organisation.

References

Living people
Australian television presenters
Australian women television presenters
Year of birth missing (living people)